Bitton railway station is the main station (and headquarters) of the Avon Valley Railway. It is located near the village of Bitton, South Gloucestershire.

Facilities
Bitton station contains a booking office, gift shop and buffet - as well as a large outdoor seating area. These facilities are available to cyclists as well as railway visitors.

On 3 September 2007, work began on the construction of a new buffet and toilet block.

Services
Regular services to Oldland Common and Avon Riverside stations run from April to October, mainly on weekends and school holidays.

References

External links

Avon Valley Railway Website

Former Midland Railway stations
Heritage railway stations in Gloucestershire
Railway stations in Great Britain opened in 1869
Railway stations in Great Britain closed in 1966
Beeching closures in England
1869 establishments in England